The People's Republic of China national rugby sevens team has played in the Sri Lanka Sevens and at the Asian Games.

Tournament history

Summer Olympics

Asian Sevens Series

Asian Games

Hong Kong Sevens

Sri Lanka Rugby 7s
{| class="wikitable"
|-
!width=40|Year
!width=165|Cup
!width=165|Plate
!width=165|Bowl
|-
|1999||||||
|-
|2000|||||| 
|-
|2001||||||
|-
|2002||||||
|-
|2003||||||
|-
|2004||||||
|-
|2005||||||
|-
|2006||||||
|-
|2007||||||
|-
|2008||||||
|}

Players

Previous Squads 
Squad to 2012 Hong Kong Sevens:
Chen Xuesen
Li Sheng
Lu Peng
Cao Zhiwen
Li Jialin
Lu Zhuan
Li Yang
Long Hanxiao
Su Hailiang
Wang Jiacheng
Wang Chongyi
Liu Guanjun

References

Rugby union in China
China national rugby union team
National rugby sevens teams